CometBird was a web browser developed from the source code of Mozilla Firefox. It is a BitComet product. It is compatible with the Windows 98, Windows 2000, Windows XP, Windows Vista, Windows 7, Windows 8, Windows 8.1, and Windows 10 operating systems. As of 2015 it is no longer being updated.

Special features
 Bookmark auto-synchronizer will allow a person to use the same bookmark and protection.
 Built-in media downloader will allow a person to download audio, video, and Flash files with only one click.
 Built-in translator which allows a person to translate a page into different languages.

References

Web browsers based on Firefox